Plus+ was a social gaming network created by Ngmoco in June 2009. The network was similar to Xbox network (formerly Xbox Live), enabling users to play games with other players from around the world. The service was also similar to OpenFeint, AGON Online, and Scoreloop.

Games that support the Plus+ Network
The following is a list of games that have been published by Ngmoco and therefore support Plus+:
Charadium (2010) - A Pictionary style game.
Dr. Awesome (2008)
Dropship (2009)
Eliminate Pro (2009) - A free online-multiplayer first-person shooter (FPS) Quake-style deathmatch game by Ngmoco. Also includes various add-ons which give free power cells.
Eliminate CO-OP (2010) - A free extension to Eliminate Pro which enables to play co-operative 2-player matches against AI Robots in any Eliminate Pro version.
GodFinger (2010)
MazeFinger (2008)
Rolando (2008) - A game similar to Loco Roco for the PSP which involves using the iPhone's accelerometer to move your "Rolandos" around to beat missions.
Rolando 2: Quest for the Golden Orchid (2009) - The second installation in the Rolando series.
Star Defense (2009) - A three-dimensional tower defense game by Ngmoco.
Topple (2008)
Topple 2 (2009)
Touch Pets: Dogs (2009)
We Rule (2010) - A FarmVille style game by newtoy and Ngmoco that involves you building a kingdom.
We Farm, We City - sequels to We Rule
Word-Fu (2009)
Word-Fu Plus (2009)
Word-Fu Plus French (2009)
Word-Fu Plus Japanese (2009)

References

External links 
 Website

2009 software
IOS games